Maximiliano Fernandez (born September 29, 1995) is an American pair skater. With his current skating partner, Valentina Plazas, he is the 2022 CS U.S. Classic bronze medalist.

With his former partner, Joy Weinberg, he is the 2016 U.S. junior national champion and finished in the top 10 at the 2016 World Junior Figure Skating Championships.

Personal life 
Fernandez was born on September 29, 1995, in Hialeah, Florida, to parents Stella, a former ballet dancer, and Alex. He has a sister, Daniella, who also competed in figure skating. Fernandez is of Peruvian descent on his mother's side, and Cuban descent on his father's.

Fernandez is a 2014 graduate of Coral Reef Senior High School and currently attends Miami Dade College.

Programs

With Plazas

Competitive highlights 
GP: Grand Prix; CS: Challenger Series; JGP: Junior Grand Prix

Pairs with Plazas

Pairs with Weinberg

Pairs with Gillett

Men's Singles

References

External links 
 

1995 births
Living people
American male pair skaters
American people of Peruvian descent
American people of Cuban descent
People from Hialeah, Florida
21st-century American people